Molefi Ntseki is a South African football coach who is Head of Technical and Youth Development Academy at Kaizer Chiefs.

Career
After coaching various national youth teams he became interim manager of the South African senior national team in August 2019. He was appointed permanent manager later that month. In October 2019 he spoke of the need for consistency with the national team players. He was sacked on 31 March 2021.

In May 2021 he became Head of Technical and Youth Development Academy at Kaizer Chiefs.

References

Date of birth missing (living people)
Living people
South African soccer managers
South Africa national soccer team managers
Year of birth missing (living people)
Kaizer Chiefs F.C. non-playing staff